is a special ward in Tokyo, Japan. The ward refers to itself as Nerima City.

, the ward has an estimated population of 721,858, with 323,296 households and a population density of 15,013 persons per km2, while 15,326 foreign residents are registered and 21.6% of the ward's population is over the age of 65. The total area is 48.08 km2.

Districts and neighborhoods

Kamiitabashi Area
 Asahigaoka
 Kotakechō
Kaminerima Area
 Asahimachi
 Doshida
 Hikarigaoka
 Kasugacho
 Mukōyama
 Nukui
 Tagara
 Takamatsu
Nakaarai Area
 Nakamura
 Nakamurakita
 Nakamuraminami
 Toyotamakami
 Toyotamakita
 Toyotamaminami
 Toyotamanaka

Nerima Area
 Hayamiya
 Hazawa
 Heiwadai
 Hikawadai
 Kitamachi
 Nerima
 Nishiki
 Sakaemachi
 Sakuradai
Ōizumi Area
 Higashiōizumi
 Minamiōizumi
 Nishiōizumi
 Nishiōizumimachi
 Ōizumichō
 Ōizumigakuen-chō

Shakujii Area
 Fujimidai
 Kamishakujii
 Kamishakujiiminami-chō
 Miharadai
 Minamitanaka
 Sekimachikita
 Sekimachihigashi
 Sekimachiminami
 Shakujii-chō
 Shakujiidai
 Shimoshakujii
 Tachinochō
 Takanodai
 Tanihara
 Tatenochō

History
In the Edo period, the area was mostly farmland producing daikon radishes, gobo burdocks, and potatoes. After the 1923 Great Kantō earthquake, many people from central Tokyo moved to the area.

On October 1, 1932, Nerima town, and Kami-Nerima, Naka-Arai, Shakujii and Ōizumi Villages were incorporated in Old Tokyo City. Prior to the creation of the ward on August 1, 1947, the area had been part of Itabashi. In 1952, the Japan Self-Defense Forces established a base there. The first division of the eastern group of the Ground Self-Defense Force has its headquarters there.  The United States Forces Japan already had a base, Grant Heights, which it returned to Japanese control in 1973. Grant Heights had been Narimasu airfield under the Imperial Japanese Army until the end of World War II. The runway is now the main street in front of the IMA department store in Hikarigaoka.

Geography

Nerima lies at the northwestern edge of the 23 central wards of Tokyo. Neighboring wards are Itabashi (to the east), Suginami, Toshima and Nakano (to the south), as well as the cities of Musashino (to the southwest) and Nishi-Tokyo (to the west). To the north lie three cities in Saitama Prefecture: Wako, Asaka and Niiza.

Climate

Economy

Toei Animation has its headquarters in the Ohizumi Studio in Nerima. Anime International Company has its headquarters in the AIC Digital Building. In addition, Studio Comet, and Mushi Production have their headquarters in Nerima.

Education

Colleges and universities
Musashino Academia Musicae
Musashi University
Nihon University Ekoda Campus
Sophia University Shakujii Campus: Faculty of Theology

National schools
 Tokyo Gakugei University Oizumi Elementary School (東京学芸大学附属大泉小学校)

Prefectural high schools
9 high schools are operated by the Tokyo Metropolitan Government Board of Education
Prefectural high schools:

Municipal schools
 operates the following:
64 elementary schools
32 junior high schools
1 combined elementary and junior high school

Combined elementary and junior high schools:
 Oizumi Sakura Gakuen (小中一貫教育校大泉桜学園)

Junior high schools:
 Asahigaoka Junior High School (旭丘中学校)
 Hikarigaoka No. 1 Junior High School (光が丘第一中学校)
 Hikarigaoka No. 2 Junior High School (光が丘第二中学校)
 Hikarigaoka No. 3 Junior High School (光が丘第三中学校)
 Hokei Junior High School (豊渓中学校)
 Kaishin No. 1 Junior High School (開進第一中学校)
 Kaishin No. 2 Junior High School (開進第二中学校)
 Kaishin No. 3 Junior High School (開進第三中学校)
 Kaishin No. 4 Junior High School (開進第四中学校)
 Kami Shakujii Junior High School (上石神井中学校)
 Kitamachi Junior High School (北町中学校)
 Miharadai Junior High School (三原台中学校)
 Minamigaoka Junior High School (南が丘中学校)
 Nakamura Junior High School (中村中学校)
 Nerima Junior High School (練馬中学校)
 Nerima Higashi Junior High School (練馬東中学校)
 Nukui Junior High School (貫井中学校)
 Oizumi Junior High School (大泉中学校)
 Oizumi No. 2 Junior High School (大泉第二中学校)
 Oizumi Gakuen Junior High School (大泉学園中学校)
 Oizumi Kita Junior High School (大泉北中学校)
 Oizumi Nishi Junior High School (大泉西中学校)
 Seki Junior High School (関中学校)
 Shakujii Junior High School (石神井中学校)
 Shakujii Higashi Junior High School (石神井東中学校)
 Shakujii Minami Junior High School (石神井南中学校)
 Shakujii Nishi Junior High School (石神井西中学校)
 Tagara Junior High School (田柄中学校)
 Toyotama Junior High School (豊玉中学校)
 Toyotama No. 2 Junior High School (豊玉第二中学校)
 Yahara Junior High School (谷原中学校)
 Yasaka Junior High School (八坂中学校)

Elementary schools:
 Asahicho Elementary School (旭町小学校)
 Asahigaoka Elementary School (旭丘小学校)
 Fujimidai Elementary School (富士見台小学校)
 Hashido Elementary School (橋戸小学校)
 Hayamiya Elementary School (早宮小学校)
 Hikarigaoka No. 8 Elementary School (光が丘第八小学校)
 Hikarigaoka Akinohi Elementary School (光が丘秋の陽小学校)
 Hikarigaoka Harunokaze Elementary School (光が丘春の風小学校)
 Hikarigaoka Natsunokumo Elementary School (光が丘夏の雲小学校)
 Hikarigaoka Shikinokaori Elementary School (光が丘四季の香小学校)
 Hokei Elementary School (豊溪小学校)
 Kaishin No. 1 Elementary School (開進第一小学校)
 Kaishin No. 2 Elementary School (開進第二小学校)
 Kaishin No. 3 Elementary School (開進第三小学校)
 Kaishin No. 4 Elementary School (開進第四小学校)
 Kamishakujii Elementary School (上石神井小学校)
 Kamishakujii Kita Elementary School (上石神井北小学校)
 Kasuga Elementary School (春日小学校)
 Kitahara Elementary School (北原小学校)
 Kitamachi Elementary School (北町小学校)
 Kitamachi Nishi Elementary School (北町西小学校)
 Kotake Elementary School (小竹小学校)
 Kowa Elementary School (光和小学校)
 Koyama Elementary School (向山小学校)
 Minamicho Elementary School (南町小学校)
 Minamigaoka Elementary School (南が丘小学校)
 Minami Tanaka Elementary School (南田中小学校)
 Nakamachi Elementary School (仲町小学校)
 Nakamura Elementary School (中村小学校)
 Nakamura Nishi Elementary School (中村西小学校)
 Nerima Elementary School (練馬小学校)
 Nerima No. 2 Elementary School (練馬第二小学校)
 Nerima No. 3 Elementary School (練馬第三小学校)
 Nerima Higashi Elementary School (練馬東小学校)
 Oizumi Elementary School (大泉小学校)
 Oizumi No. 1 Elementary School (大泉第一小学校)
 Oizumi No. 2 Elementary School (大泉第二小学校)
 Oizumi No. 3 Elementary School (大泉第三小学校)
 Oizumi No. 4 Elementary School (大泉第四小学校)
 Oizumi No. 6 Elementary School (大泉第六小学校)
 Oizumi Gakuen Elementary School (大泉学園小学校)
 Oizumi Gakuen Midori Elementary School (大泉学園緑小学校)
 Oizumi Higashi Elementary School (大泉東小学校)
 Oizumi Kita Elementary School (大泉北小学校)
 Oizumi Minami Elementary School (大泉南小学校)
 Oizumi Nishi Elementary School (大泉西小学校)
 Sekimachi Elementary School (関町小学校)
 Sekimachi Kita Elementary School (関町北小学校)
 Senshin Elementary School (泉新小学校)
 Shakujii Elementary School (石神井小学校)
 Shakujiidai Elementary School (石神井台小学校)
 Shakujii Higashi Elementary School (石神井東小学校)
 Shakujii Nishi Elementary School (石神井西小学校)
 Shimo Shakujii Elementary School (下石神井小学校)
 Tagara Elementary School (田柄小学校)
 Tagara No. 2 Elementary School (田柄第二小学校)
 Takamatsu Elementary School (高松小学校)
 Tateno Elementary School (立野小学校)
 Toyotama Elementary School (豊玉小学校)
 Toyotama No. 2 Elementary School (豊玉第二小学校)
 Toyotama Higashi Elementary School (豊玉東小学校)
 Toyotama Minami Elementary School (豊玉南小学校)
 Yasaka Elementary School (八坂小学校)
 Yawara Elementary School (谷原小学校)

Private schools
One elementary school
Four junior and senior high schools
One high school
One international school

They are:
 
 Musashi High School and Junior High School
 
  (junior and senior high school)
 Waseda University Junior and Senior High School

International Schools
 Aoba-Japan International School

Transportation

Rail

Tokyo Metro
Yūrakuchō Line: Kotake Mukaihara, Hikawadai, Heiwadai, Chikatetsu Akatsuka Stations
Fukutoshin Line: Kotake Mukaihara, Hikawadai, Heiwadai, Chikatetsu Akatsuka Stations
Tokyo Metropolitan Bureau of Transportation
Ōedo Line: Shin-egota (on the boundary with Nakano), Nerima, Toshimaen, Nerima-kasugachō, Hikarigaoka Stations

Seibu Railway
Ikebukuro Line: Ekoda, Sakuradai, Nerima, Nakamurabashi, Fujimidai, Nerima-Takanodai, Shakujii-kōen, Ōizumi-gakuen Stations
Shinjuku Line: Kami-Shakujii, Musashi-Seki Stations
Toshima Line: Nerima, Toshimaen Stations
Yūrakuchō Line: Kotake Mukaihara, Shin-Sakuradai, Nerima Stations
Tobu Railway
Tōjō Line: Tōbu-Nerima and Shimo-Akatsuka Stations are on the boundary with Itabashi

Bus
Kanto Bus
Keio Bus: The Chu 92 bus travels between Nerima and Nakano Stations
Kokusai-Kogyo Bus
Seibu Bus
Toei Bus: The Bus Service Division of the Tokyo Metropolitan Bureau of Transportation operates 5 routes in Nerima Ward.

Road
Expressways:
Kan-etsu Expressway
Tokyo Gaikan Expressway
National highways:
National Route 17 (Shin Ōmiya Bypass)
National Route 254 (Kawagoe Kaidō)
Other major roads:
Ōme Kaidō (Prefectural Road 4)
Shin-Ōme Kaidō (Prefectural Road 245)
Mejiro Dōri (Prefectural Road 8)
Hoya Kaidō (Prefectural Road 233)
Kan-nana (Prefectural Road 318)
Kan-pachi (Prefectural Road 311)
Nakasugi Dōri (Prefectural Road 427)
Senkawa Dōri (Prefectural Road 439)
Fuji Kaidō (Prefectural Road 441)
Sasame Dōri (Prefectural Road 443&68)
Igusa Dōri (Prefectural Road 444)

Leisure

Amusement parks
Toshimaen

Museums
Ward art museum
Iwasaki Chihiro illustrated book museum

Parks

Hikarigaoka Park
Shakujii Park
Ōizumi-Chūō Park
Musashiseki Park
Johoku-Chuo Park (on the boundary with Itabashi)
Takamatsu Park

Media
Nerima prepares the Nerima News Azalea, a city newsletter, in English.

In popular culture
Nerima is the setting of Rumiko Takahashi's long running and popular manga and anime series Ranma ½ and Urusei Yatsura. As one of the first series in either media to achieve widespread popularity in the English speaking world, Ranma introduced Nerima to western audiences, with several locations recognizable as backgrounds.

It is also the setting of  Takamitsu Kondou's Nerima Daikon Brothers and Kengo Hanazawa's I Am a Hero.

The main setting of the anime and manga series Prison School is a high school named Hachimitsu Academy, which is located in Nerima.

It is also the setting for four popular anime and manga series, Your Lie in April, Tokyo Ghoul, Rent-A-Girlfriend, and Doraemon.

The popular Japanese horror franchise, Ju On, takes place predominantly in Nerima.

Nekoma High School, one of the main teams of popular manga and anime Haikyu!!, is in Nerima.

Other
 Japan Ground Self-Defense Force Nerima Base

International relations
Nerima has a sister-city relationship with Ipswich, Queensland, Australia. Nerima Gardens in Ipswich commemorates the tie. Nerima also has a similar link to Haidian District, Beijing, China.

See also

References

External links

Nerima City Official Website 

 
Wards of Tokyo